The Shire of Strathbogie is a local government area in the Hume region of Victoria, Australia, located in the north-east part of the state.

It includes the towns of Avenel, Euroa, Longwood, Nagambie, Strathbogie and Violet Town. It was formed in 1994 from the amalgamation of parts of the Shire of Euroa, Shire of Goulburn, Shire of Violet Town, Shire of McIvor and Rural City of Seymour.

The Shire is governed and administered by the Strathbogie Shire Council; its seat of local government and administrative centre is located at the council headquarters in Euroa, it also has service centres located in Nagambie and Violet Town. The Shire is named after the major geographical feature in the region, the Strathbogie Ranges, which is located in the south-east of the LGA.

It is also known for its sheep production, horse studs (earning the title "The Horse Capital of Victoria"), wineries (Mitchelton, Tahbilk, Fowles Wines), olives and alpacas. Tourism is a growing industry in the area, with many B&Bs, hotels and restaurants.

Council

Current composition
The council is composed of five wards and seven councillors, with two councillors per ward elected to represent each of the Seven Creeks and Lake Nagambie wards, and one councillor per remaining ward elected to represent each of the other wards.

Administration and governance
The council meets in the council chambers at the council headquarters in the Euroa Municipal Offices, which is also the location of the council's administrative activities. It also provides customer services at both its administrative centre in Euroa, and its service centres in Nagambie and Violet Town.

Townships and localities
The 2021 census, the shire had a population of 11,455 up from 10,274 in the 2016 census

^ - Territory divided with another LGA

See also
 List of localities (Victoria)
 List of places on the Victorian Heritage Register in the Shire of Strathbogie

References

External links
Strathbogie Shire Council official website
Metlink local public transport map
Link to Land Victoria interactive maps
Strathbogie Ranges Tourism
The Euroa Gazette

Local government areas of Victoria (Australia)
Hume (region)
 
Hume Highway